Thomasia stelligera is a species of flowering plant in the family Malvaceae and is endemic to the south-west of Western Australia. It is a low, spreading shrub with scattered, narrowly oblong leaves, and racemes of mauve flowers.

Description
The leaves are glabrous on the upper surface, covered with silvery hairs on the lower surface and have wavy edges. Flowering occurs from August to October.

Taxonomy and naming
This species was first formally described in 1852 by Nikolai Turczaninow who gave it the name Lasiopetalum stelligerum in the Bulletin de la Société Impériale des Naturalistes de Moscou. In 1863, George Bentham transferred the species to the genus Thomasia in Flora Australiensis. The specific epithet (stelligera) means "starry" or "star-bearing".

Distribution and habitat
This thomasia grows in heath and shrubland between the Oldfield River, Jerramungup and Denmark in the Esperance Plains, Jarrah Forest, Mallee and Warren bioregions of south-western Western Australia.

Conservation status
Thomasia stelligera is listed as "not threatened" by the Government of Western Australia Department of Biodiversity, Conservation and Attractions.

References

stelligera
Rosids of Western Australia
Plants described in 1852
Taxa named by Nikolai Turczaninow